Louay Wael Mohamed Badr (born 4 June 1992) commonly known as Luca Badr  is an Egyptian professional footballer who plays for El Entag El Harby of Egypt.

Career
Badr has previously played for Belgian Pro League side Lierse S.K. and Egyptian giants Al Ahly.

On 27 April 2014, Badr made his full debut in Belgian Pro League with Lierse S.K. in 2013–14 Belgian Pro League 4–2 won over Waasland-Beveren. It was Badr's second game for Lierse S.K., having came on as an 85th-minute substitute in their previous game against KV Oostende. Badr joined Al-Ahly in June 2014.

References

External links
 
 

1992 births
Egyptian footballers
Belgian Pro League players
Lierse S.K. players
Egyptian expatriate footballers
Egyptian expatriate sportspeople in Belgium
Expatriate footballers in Belgium
Living people
Al Ahly SC players
Egyptian Premier League players
Association football central defenders